Brian Ford is a Canadian retired police officer who served as Chief of Police of the Ottawa-Carleton Regional Police from 1993 to 2000.

In 2006, he was a candidate in Nepean—Carleton for the Ontario Liberal Party. He endorsed Bob Chiarelli for Mayor of Ottawa in the 2022 Ottawa municipal election.

Electoral history

References

Ottawa police chiefs
Politicians from Ottawa
Ontario Liberal Party candidates in Ontario provincial elections
Living people
Year of birth missing (living people)